Kenan Horić (born 13 September 1990) is a Bosnian professional footballer who plays as a centre-back for Bosnian Premier League club Posušje.

References

External links
NZS profile 
K. Horić at nogomania.com

1990 births
Living people
Sportspeople from Zenica
Bosnia and Herzegovina footballers
Association football central defenders
NK Čelik Zenica players
NK Domžale players
Antalyaspor footballers
Pafos FC players
FK Mladost Doboj Kakanj players
FK Kukësi players
FK Olimpik players
HŠK Posušje players
Premier League of Bosnia and Herzegovina players
Slovenian PrvaLiga players
Süper Lig players
Cypriot First Division players
Kategoria Superiore players
Bosnia and Herzegovina expatriate footballers
Expatriate footballers in Slovenia
Bosnia and Herzegovina expatriate sportspeople in Slovenia
Expatriate footballers in Turkey
Bosnia and Herzegovina expatriate sportspeople in Turkey
Expatriate footballers in Cyprus
Bosnia and Herzegovina expatriate sportspeople in Cyprus
Expatriate footballers in Albania
Bosnia and Herzegovina expatriate sportspeople in Albania